The year 1728 in music involved some significant events.

Events 
26 March – Johann Sebastian Bach revives his St John Passion (BWV 245, BC D 2c) with some textual and instrumentational changes.
Giuseppe Tartini opens a school for violinists in Padua.
Johann Georg Pisendel begins studying composition under Johann David Heinichen.
Domenico Scarlatti returns to Rome, where he meets his first wife.
Johann Joachim Quantz visits Berlin and performs in the presence of the Crown Prince of Prussia, who insists on taking lessons from him.
Deafness forces Johann Mattheson to retire from his post as musical director of Hamburg Cathedral.
In music theory, the circle of fifths is described by Johann David Heinichen, in his 1728 treatise Der Generalbass in der Composition; the first such description in Western European literature

Classical music 
Johann Sebastian Bach – Partita in D major, BWV 828
Jean Francois Dandrieu – Pieces de Clavecin, Book 2
Giovanni Antonio Guido – Scherzi armonici sopra le quattro staggioni dell'anno, Op. 3
Jean-Marie Leclair – 12 Violin Sonatas, Op. 2
Vincent Lübeck – Clavier Übung for harpsichord
Michel Pignolet de Montéclair – Morte di Lucretia
Jean-Philippe Rameau – Cantates Françaises
Thomas Roseingrave – Voluntarys and Fugues
Giuseppe Tartini – 6 Violin Concertos, Op. 1
Georg Philipp Telemann 
Der getreue Music-Meister (editor, continues through 1729) Hamburg: [Telemann].
Das Frauenzimmer verstimmt sich immer, song for voice and basso continuo, TWV 25:37, lection 5
Ich kann lachen, weinen, scherzen (cantata, words by M. von Ziegler), for soprano and basso continuo, TWV 20:15, lections 19–20.
Intrada, nebst burlesquer Suite (nicknamed "Gulliver Suite") for two violins unaccompanied, TWV 40:108 
Säume nicht geliebte Schöne, song for voice and basso continuo), TWV 25:38, lection 21

Opera
Bartolomeo Cordans – Ormisda
Geminiano Giacomelli – Gianguir
George Frideric Handel 
Siroe, re di Persia, HWV 24
Tolomeo, re di Egitto
Leonardo Leo  
Catone in Utica
La pastorella commattuta
Johann Christoph Pepusch – The Beggar's Opera
Leonardo Vinci 
Catone in Utica
Didone Abandonnata
Medo

Musical theater
 The Beggar's Opera opened at Lincoln's Inn Fields on January 29 and ran for 62 performances

Births 
January 16 – Niccolò Piccinni, composer of over 100 operas (died 1800)
January 17 – Johann Gottfried Müthel, keyboard virtuoso and composer (died 1788)
September 21 – Louis Emmanuel Eadin, composer
December 9 – Pietro Alessandro Guglielmi, composer (died 1804)
December 21 – Hermann Raupach, composer (died 1778)
December 25 – Johann Adam Hiller, composer (died 1804)

Deaths 
February 12 – Agostino Steffani, composer and diplomat (born 1653)
August 15 – Marin Marais, composer and bass-viol player (born 1656)
October 8 – Anne Danican Philidor, composer and founder of the Concert Spirituel (born 1681)
November 19 – Leopold, Prince of Anhalt-Köthen, employer of Johann Sebastian Bach (born 1694) (smallpox)
probable – Gaetano Greco, composer (born c. 1657)

 
18th century in music
Music by year